Estrone phosphate (E1P), or estrone 3-phosphate, is an estrogen and steroid sulfatase inhibitor which was never marketed. It has similar affinity for steroid sulfatase as estrone sulfate and acts as a competitive inhibitor of the enzyme. In contrast to estrone sulfate however, it is not hydrolyzed by steroid sulfatase and is instead metabolized by phosphatases.

See also
 List of estrogen esters § Estrone esters
 Estradiol phosphate
 Estriol phosphate

References

Abandoned drugs
Estrone esters
Phosphate esters
Prodrugs
Steroid sulfatase inhibitors
Synthetic estrogens